Stadium Racing Colmar is a football club located in Colmar, France. They play in the Championnat National 2, the fourth tier of French football.

History
Founded in 1919 as AS Colmar, the club is based in Colmar, Alsace, and plays its home matches at the Colmar Stadium in the city. SR Colmar has played one season in the Division 1 (Ligue 1) in 1948–49 and have spent five seasons in the Division 2 (Ligue 2). On 23 January 2010, Colmar defeated professional club Lille in the Coupe de France 10–9 on penalty kicks, giving the club one of its biggest victories to date.

The club was liquidated in November 2016, and was reformed as Stadium Racing Colmar.

Name changes 

 1919–1920: AS Colmar
 1920–1940: Sports Réunis Colmar
 1940–1944: SpVgg Kolmar
 1945–1962: Sports Réunis Colmar
 1962–1963: SR Colmar Wittisheim
 1963–1964: AS Colmar
 1964–2016: Sports Réunis Colmar
 2016–present: Stadium Racing Colmar

Stadium 

Owned by the city of Colmar, the Colmar Stadium has been the home of SR Colmar since 2001, succeeding the Stade des Francs. The sports complex at the ground is made up of three football fields, including one of synthetic grass. The main pitch has a surface of natural grass. The stadium has a grandstand with a seating capacity of 1,300; 40 seats are accessible to the handicapped.

Honours
 Championnat de France Amateur Group A: 2009–10
 Division d'Honneur Alsace: 1972–73, 1996–97

References

 
Football clubs from former German territories
Association football clubs established in 1919
1919 establishments in France
Sport in Colmar
Football clubs in Grand Est
Ligue 1 clubs